This is a list of episodes of the 2014-2015 Super Sentai series Ressha Sentai ToQger. As the motif for ToQger is trains, the episodes are called . The first episode is not numbered "Station 1" but is called  and the finale is called .

Episodes



Notes

References

Ressha Sentai ToQger